The red-fronted parrotlet (Touit costaricensis) is a Near Threatened species of bird in subfamily Arinae of the family Psittacidae, the African and New World parrots. It is found in Costa Rica and Panama.

Taxomomy and systematics

The red-fronted parrotlet has been treated by some authors as a subspecies of the blue-fronted parrotlet (T. dilectissimus), and the two are now considered a superspecies. The red-fronted parrotlet is monotypic.

Description

Its body is mostly green, darker above than below. Its forehead ("front") and much of its face are red with a bit of blue on the latter and a white eye ring. Its crown and hindneck are bronze-green and its throat yellowish. It has much red on the wing's "wrist", and its primaries are black with green outer edges. Its underwing coverts are yellow. Its tail has a square end; the central tail feathers are black and the others yellow with black tips. Males have more red on their face than females and immatures have almost none.

Distribution and habitat

The red-fronted parrotlet is found from western Costa Rica into western Panama as far as Coclé Province, and is more numerous on the Caribbean slope than the Pacific.

Behavior

Movement

The red-fronted parrotlet is an elevational migrant, moving between high elevation in the dry season and lower, sometimes to sea level, in the rainy season.

Feeding

The red-fronted parrotlet typically forages on trees and epiphytes in the canopy. Its diet is fruit; plants of families Melastomataceae and Ericaceae are known contributors.

Vocalization

The red-fronted parrotlet gives "a shrill, querulous chheee? chee, che-de-de-dee" call. Its flight call is "a slightly nasal 'kyee kyee'."

Status

The IUCN originally assessed the red-fronted parrotlet as Near Threatened, then in 2000 as Vulnerable, and since 2021 again as Near Threatened. It has a somewhat restricted range and an estimated population of less than 12,000 mature individuals that is believed to be decreasing. "Habitat loss is however low within the range, particularly in the highlands, and the species is not facing substantial threats." "Uncommon to rare, although probably much overlooked and tolerant of a degree of habitat disturbance; apparently not traded."

References

red-fronted parrotlet
Birds of Costa Rica
Birds of Panama
red-fronted parrotlet
red-fronted parrotlet